The General's Daughter is a 1999 American mystery thriller film directed by Simon West from a screenplay co-written by Christopher Bertolini and William Goldman, based on the novel of the same name by Nelson DeMille. It stars John Travolta, Madeleine Stowe, James Cromwell, Timothy Hutton, Clarence Williams III, and James Woods. The plot concerns the mysterious death of the daughter of a prominent Army general. The General's Daughter received negative reviews from critics, but was a box-office success, grossing $149.7 million worldwide against an estimated budget of $60 to $95 million.

Plot
While in Georgia, Chief Warrant Officer Paul Brenner, an undercover agent of the United States Army Criminal Investigation Division Command, masquerades as First Sergeant Frank White to broker an illegal arms trade with a self-proclaimed freedom fighter. At Fort MacCallum, Brenner gets a flat tire and Captain Elisabeth Campbell, a psychological operations officer and the daughter of Lieutenant General Joseph "Fighting Joe" Campbell, the base commander, helps him change it. The next evening she is found murdered. The base provost marshal, Colonel William Kent, secures the crime scene. Brenner and rape specialist Warrant Officer Sara Sunhill are brought in to investigate. They receive Elisabeth's records and notice that her grades plummeted her second year at West Point. Brenner wants to search Elisabeth's house, but Kent declines because it is off-base and therefore outside their jurisdiction.

Picking the lock of Elisabeth's house, Brenner and Sunhill find a room containing video and BDSM equipment, but an intruder attacks him and removes the videotapes. He questions Elisabeth's superior officer, Colonel Robert Moore, whose evasiveness leads to his arrest on charges of conduct unbecoming an officer. At the crime scene, Sunhill is attacked in an attempt to intimidate her and Brenner. During the attack she notices one assailant is wearing a silver claddagh ring, and identifies him as Captain Jake Elby. At gunpoint, Elby confesses that Elisabeth was sexually promiscuous with the men on the base as part of an extensive "psychological warfare" campaign against her father.

Back at the jail, Kent releases Moore, confining him to quarters at his home on-base. Upon returning to Moore's home, he, Brenner, and Sunhill find him dead with an apparently self-inflicted bullet to the head, which Brenner doubts was suicide. Campbell's adjutant, Colonel George Fowler, attempts to close the investigation stating Moore killed himself out of guilt, but Brenner insists on continuing the investigation. Brenner and Sunhill travel to West Point, where Elisabeth's psychiatrist, Colonel Donald Slesinger, explains that during a training exercise seven years earlier, several cadets brutally gang-raped Elisabeth and left her naked and staked down in the same position she was found murdered, and a cadet came forward regarding the attack. Sunhill tracks down the former cadet and tricks him into admitting his presence during the attack; feeling trapped and guilt-ridden, he admits to witnessing it and explains how the male cadets hated Elisabeth, since she surpassed them as a cadet.

Brenner visits the general, who corroborates the attack and confirms that before visiting Elisabeth in the hospital, he met with another general, who felt the assailants would go undetected given the type of training exercise and stated the attack going public could ruin the concept of women in the military. Campbell reluctantly agreed and tried to convince Elisabeth to forget the attack, effectively traumatizing her. After revealing that Sunhill easily identified Elisabeth's assailants, who face 20 years in prison, Brenner deduces Elisabeth had Moore help her stage the attack scene so she could force her father to see what he covered up. Campbell states that he threatened Elisabeth with a court martial due to her affairs with multiple officers, including Kent, and that she responded to his ultimatum with the staged attack scene. Unmoved, he left her tied naked to the stakes.

Realizing that Kent releasing Moore from prison, taking Elisabeth's keys, and sleeping with her makes him a suspect, Brenner learns that Kent is at the crime scene with Sunhill and wants him to join them. At the scene, Kent admits his obsession with Elisabeth and that after he found her at the staged scene, upset over her father being unmoved by her effort, she dismissed Kent and spat in his face. Enraged, he strangled her. After admitting to murdering Moore to evade detection, Kent then commits suicide by stepping on a mine. As Campbell prepares to board the plane to accompany Elisabeth's body to the funeral, Brenner confronts him and blames him for her death, explaining that his betrayal effectively killed her and Kent just put her out of her misery. Though Campbell warns him to keep silent, Brenner has him court-martialed for conspiracy to conceal a crime, ruining the general's career.

Cast
 John Travolta as Chief Warrant Officer Paul Brenner
 Madeleine Stowe as Chief Warrant Officer Sarah Sunhill
 James Cromwell as Lieutenant General Joe Campbell
 Timothy Hutton as Colonel Bill Kent
 Leslie Stefanson as Captain Elisabeth Campbell, General Campbell's daughter and Psychological Operations Officer
 Daniel von Bargen as Chief of Police Yardley
 Clarence Williams III as Colonel George Fowler, Adjuntant to the General
 James Woods as Colonel Bob Moore, Elisabeth's commanding officer
 Mark Boone Jr. as Sergeant Dalbert Elkins
 John Beasley as Colonel Don Slesinger, Elisabeth's psychiatrist at West Point
 Boyd Kestner as Captain Jake Elby
 Brad Beyer as Captain Bransford
 John Benjamin Hickey as Captain Goodson
 John Frankenheimer as General Sonnenberg

Production
The General's Daughter was directed by Simon West and produced by Mace Neufeld. It was an adaptation of the bestselling book of the same name, written by Nelson DeMille and published in 1992. William Goldman did some work on the script. Michael Douglas was originally attached to star.

Much of the film was filmed in various locations in and around Savannah, Georgia.

A love scene between Travolta and Stowe was cut from the final film.

Two key changes were made after test screenings: Travolta's character made a stronger moral stand at the end, and it became clearer at the beginning that he was a military investigator working undercover.
	
Talking about the rape scene, Leslie Stefanson said, "It was horrible for me, but there was no way to avoid it. I don't want to necessarily ever do it again, but an important message could be brought up by it."

Reception

Box office 
Against an estimated budget from $60 to $95 million, The General's Daughter grossed almost $103 million at the domestic box office, contributing to a worldwide gross of $150 million.

Critical response 
The General's Daughter garnered generally negative reviews from critics. The website's critical consensus reads: "Contrived performances and over-the-top sequences offer little real drama". On Metacritic, the film has a score of 47 out of 100, based on 24 critics, indicating "mixed or average reviews". Audiences surveyed by CinemaScore gave the film a grade "B+" on scale of A to F.

Roger Ebert described The General's Daughter as well-made and with credible performances, but marred by a death scene that was "so unnecessarily graphic and gruesome that by the end I felt sort of unclean." Janet Maslin of The New York Times commended Travolta for carrying the film with "enjoyable ease" and Bertolini and Goldman for supplying "enough smart, amusing banter" in his interactions with Stowe and Woods, but criticized West's direction for "underutilizing good actors while pumping up the story's gratuitously ugly side" with lazy "fetishistic touches" of its subject matter, concluding that: "[A]ll the movie cares about is the deed itself and the way it was done." Russell Smith of The Austin Chronicle gave praise to the performances of Travolta, Stowe and Woods, but felt there was a disconnect between the screenwriters and the director when crafting the narrative, concluding that: "The General's Daughter inspires all kinds of cognitive dissonance with its blend of high-mindedness and cheesy titillation. Very odd, and very icky. Highly recommended for graduate psychology students in aberrant sexuality, but others can probably skip sans regret." Rolling Stones Peter Travers also commended Travolta and Stowe for keeping the viewers "attractively distracted" with their chemistry and criticized West for sending his supporting cast "adrift" into "deep-fried Freudian melodrama", calling it "a lurid mess, a Southern gumbo simmering in Gothic cliche." Rita Kempley of The Washington Post criticized the film for playing up its "critical look at military injustice" by indulging in the misogyny of its overall plot, concluding that it "doesn't provide a compelling indictment of cronyism and duplicity within the military. While coverups and sex discrimination are continuing problems throughout society, this movie isn't offering any solutions. It's having its cheesecake and eating it, too."

References

External links

 
 
 
 

1999 films
1999 drama films
1999 thriller films
1990s American films
1990s English-language films
1990s mystery thriller films
1990s political thriller films
1990s thriller drama films
American mystery films
American mystery thriller films
American political thriller films
American thriller drama films
Films about American military personnel
Films about rape in the United States
Films about the United States Army's psychological operations units
Films based on American crime novels
Films based on military novels
Films directed by Simon West
Films produced by Mace Neufeld
Films scored by Carter Burwell
Films set in Georgia (U.S. state)
Films set in the United States Military Academy
Films shot in Savannah, Georgia
Films with screenplays by William Goldman
Paramount Pictures films